The Villareal Stadium is a sports complex in Roxas, Capiz, Philippines.The sports venue has a rubberized track oval, open paved basketball, volleyball and tennis courts, an Olympic size swimming pool and a 6,000 capacity air-conditioned gymnasium with a basketball court known as the Capiz Gymnasium. The stadium also hosts a football field.

It was named after Cornelio Villareal, of Mambusao, Capiz who served as Speaker of the House of Representatives from 1962-1967 and again from 1971-1972.

References

Tennis venues in the Philippines
Basketball venues in the Philippines
Swimming venues in the Philippines
Athletics (track and field) venues in the Philippines
Football venues in the Philippines
Buildings and structures in Roxas, Capiz
Tourist attractions in Capiz